Something for the Boys is a musical with music and lyrics by Cole Porter and a book by Herbert Fields and Dorothy Fields. Produced by Mike Todd, the show opened on Broadway in 1943 and starred Ethel Merman in her fifth Cole Porter musical.

Productions
Out of town tryouts began on December 18, 1942 at the Shubert Theatre, Boston, Massachusetts.

The musical opened on Broadway at the Alvin Theatre on January 7, 1943 and closed on January 8, 1944 after 422 performances.  It starred Ethel Merman (Blossom Hart), Bill Johnson (Rocky Fulton), Betty Garrett (Mary-Frances), Paula Laurence (Chiquita Hart), and Allen Jenkins (Harry Hart). The director was Hassard Short, choreographer Jack Cole, costumes were by Billy Livingston and the set design was by Howard Bay. A national tour starred Joan Blondell who would go on to marry producer Mike Todd.

The musical premiered in the West End at the Coliseum Theatre on March 30, 1944 and closed on May 20, 1944. It starred Evelyn Dall (Blossom), Daphne Barker (Chiquita), Bobby Wright (Harry), Leigh Stafford (Rocky) and Jack Billings (Laddie).

The most recent production of the show was by Grace College in Winona Lake, Indiana in May 2013 on the Rodeheaver Auditorium stage. 
Director Michael Yocum was able to find almost all of the original orchestrations making this one of the first productions in decades to feature the original score.

Plot 
Three cousins inherit a Texas ranch that is next to a military base. Blossom Hart is a worker in the war department, Chiquita Hart is a night club dancer/singer, and Harry Hart is a carnival pitchman. Although none of the cousins know each other, they join together to convert the ranch into a boarding house for soldiers' wives. However, Lieutenant Colonel Grubbs thinks the activities at the house are suspicious and he tries to close it down. Meanwhile, Blossom and Rocky Fulton, a bandleader in the Army band, begin a romance, much to the displeasure of his fiance, Melanie.

Recordings
In 1985, the Original Cast Recording was released on the AEI Records label derived from long lost transcriptions made for shortwave radio transmission.

A version of the title song was recorded by Ethel Merman for her Ethel Merman Disco Album in 1979.

PS Classics released a complete recording in December 2018, using the original orchestrations. The cast included Elizabeth Stanley (Blossom Hart), Danny Burstein (Harry Hart), Andréa Burns (Chiquita Hart), Edward Hibbert, Sara Jean Ford, and Philip Chaffin (Rocky Fulton).

Songs

Act I	 		 
 See That You're Born in Texas - Ensemble
 When My Baby Goes to Town - Staff Sgt. Rocky Fulton
 Something for the Boys - Blossom Hart and Boys
 When We're Home on the Range - Blossom Hart, Chiquita Hart and Harry Hart
 Could It Be You? - Staff Sgt. Rocky Fulton and Boys
 Hey, Good Lookin' - Blossom Hart and Staff Sgt. Rocky Fulton
 Hey, Good Lookin' (Reprise) - Betty-Jean, Corp. Burns, Girls and Boys
 He's a Right Guy - Blossom Hart
 The Leader of a Big Time Band - Blossom Hart
 		 
Act II
 I'm in Love with a Soldier Boy - Mary-Frances, Girls and Boys
 There's a Happy Land in the Sky - Blossom Hart, Chiquita Hart, Harry Hart, Mr. Tobias Twitch and Staff Sgt. Rocky Fulton
 He's a Right Guy (Reprise) - Blossom Hart
 Could It Be You? (Reprise) - Staff Sgt. Rocky Fulton and Ensemble
 By the Mississinewa - Blossom Hart and Chiquita Hart

Response
Life Magazine wrote that the musical was "gay and glittering" and that "from start to finish the show belongs to the exuberant Ethel Merman".

References

External links
 

Musicals by Cole Porter
Broadway musicals
1943 musicals
Musicals by Herbert Fields